Chanom Sirirangsri (born 12 March 1935) is a Thai long-distance runner. He competed in the marathon at the 1964 Summer Olympics.

References

1935 births
Living people
Athletes (track and field) at the 1964 Summer Olympics
Chanom Sirirangsri
Chanom Sirirangsri
Chanom Sirirangsri
Place of birth missing (living people)